Antiopella barbarensis, common name Santa Barbara janolus, is a colourful sea slug, a cladobranch nudibranch, a marine gastropod mollusc in the family Janolidae.

Distribution 
Antiopella barbarensis is a commonly found nudibranch on the Pacific coast inhabiting tide pools of La Jolla, California. Populations also expand to some parts of Costa Rica.

Behrens 1991 gives the distribution as "San Francisco Bay to Baja California, Gulf of California, Mexico".

References 

Proctonotidae
Gastropods described in 1863